Among the approximately one million foreign volunteers and conscripts who served in the Wehrmacht during World War II were ethnic Belgians, Czechs, Dutch, Finns, Danes, French, Hungarians, Norwegians, Poles, Portuguese, Swedes, Swiss along with people from Great Britain, Ireland, Estonia, Latvia, Lithuania, and the Balkans. At least 47,000 Spaniards served in the Blue Division.

Some estimates state anywhere between 600,000 and 1,400,000 Soviet citizens (Russians and other non-Russian ethnic minorities) joined the Wehrmacht forces as Hiwis (or Hilfswillige). The Ukrainian collaborationist forces were composed of an estimated number of 180,000 volunteers serving with units scattered all over Europe. Russian émigrés and defectors from the Soviet Union formed the Russian Liberation Army or fought as Hilfswillige within German units of the Wehrmacht primarily on the Eastern Front. Non-Russians from the Soviet Union formed the Ostlegionen (literally "Eastern Legions"). The East Battalions comprized a total of 175,000 personnel. These units were all commanded by General Ernst August Köstring. (1876−1953) A lower estimate for the total number of foreign volunteers that served in the entire German armed forces (including the Waffen SS) is 350,000.

These units were often under the command of German officers and some published their own propaganda newssheets.

List of units

Soviet Union

Croatia

Middle East
 Legion Freies Arabien (Arab volunteers)
 Deutsch-Arabische Lehr-Abteilung (Arab volunteers)
 Deutsch-Arabisches Bataillon Nr. 845 (Arab volunteers)
 Freiwilligen-Stamm-Regiment 1 (Turkish volunteers)

Azerbaijani, Georgian and Armenian volunteers

 Armenische Legion (Armenian volunteers)
 Aserbaidschanische Legion (Azerbaijani volunteers)
 30. Waffen-Grenadier-Division der SS (Russische Nr. 2)
 Georgische Legion (Georgian volunteers)
 Freiwilligen-Stamm-Regiment 1 (Georgian volunteers)
 Freiwilligen-Stamm-Regiment 2 (Armenians & Azerbaijanis)
 Sonderverband Bergmann (Georgian and Azerbaijani volunteers)
 I. Sonderverband Bergmann Battalion (Georgian volunteers)
 III. Sonderverband Bergmann Battalion (Azerbaijani volunteers)
 SS-Waffengruppe Georgien (Georgian volunteers)
 SS-Waffengruppe Armenien (Armenian volunteers)
 SS-Waffengruppe Aserbaidschan (Azeri volunteers)

North Caucasian volunteers
 Kaukasisch-Mohammedanische Legion (Azerbaijani, Circassian, Daghestani, Chechen, Ingush, and Lezghin volunteer units)
 Kaukasischer-Waffen-Verband der SS or Freiwilligen Brigade Nordkaukasien (volunteers from the North Caucasus region)
 Nordkaukasische Legion ("North Caucasian Legion" volunteers from the North Caucasus region)
 Freiwilligen-Stamm-Regiment 1 (North Caucasian volunteers)
 Sonderverband Bergmann (North Caucasian volunteers)
 II. Sonderverband Bergmann Battalion (North Caucasian volunteers)
 SS-Waffengruppe Nordkaukasus (North Caucasian volunteers; Chechens, Ingush & Dagestani)

Central Asian volunteers
 162. (Turkistan) Infanterie-Division (Turkestani volunteers)
 Muselmanischen SS-Division Neu-Turkistan (Turkestani volunteers)
 Turkistanische Legion (volunteers from Central Asia; Uzbeks, Kazakhs & Turkmen)
 Böhler-Brigade (Turkestani volunteers)
 1. Turkestanisches-Arbeits-Battalion (Turkestani volunteers)
 2. Turkestanisches-Arbeits-Battalion (Turkestani volunteers)
 3. Turkestanisches-Arbeits-Battalion (Turkestani volunteers)
 Osttürkischer Waffen-Verband der SS or 1. Ostmuselmanisches SS-Regiment (Central Asia  volunteers)
 Turkestanisches-Arbeits-Ersatz-Battalion (Turkestani volunteers)
 Waffen-Gruppe Turkistan (Central Asian volunteers)

Kalmykian volunteers
 Kalmüken Verband Dr. Doll (Kalmykian volunteers)
 Abwehrtrupp 103 (Kalmykian volunteers)
 Kalmücken Legion or Kalmücken-Kavallerie-Korps (Kalmykian volunteers)

Tatar volunteers
 Tatar Legion
 SS-Waffengruppe Idel-Ural (Turkic volunteers from Volga/Ural area)
 Waffen-Gebirgs-Brigade der SS (Tatar Nr. 1) (Tatar volunteers)
 30. Waffen-Grenadier-Division der SS (Russische Nr. 2) (Armenian & Tatar volunteer units)
 Wolgatatarische Legion (Volga Tatars but also of other volunteers from the region)
 Tataren-Gebirgsjäger-Regiment der SS (Crimean Tatar volunteers)
 Waffen-Gruppe Krim (Crimean Tatar volunteers)
 Schutzmannschaft Battalion (Crimean Tatar volunteers)

Cossack volunteers
  1. Kosaken-Kavallerie-Division (volunteers from Cossacks in Cherson, from February 1945 XV. SS-Kosaken-Kavallerie-Korps)
 Kosaken-Reiter-Brigade Kaukasus II (Caucasus Cossack volunteers)
 Kuban-Kosaken-Reiter-Regiment 3 (Kuban Cossack volunteers)
 Don-Kosaken-Reiter-Regiment 5 (Don Cossack volunteers)
 Terek-Kosaken-Reiter-Regiment 6 (Terek Cossack volunteers)
 Kosaken-Artillerie-Regiment 2 (Caucasian Cossack volunteers)
 Sibirisches Kosaken-Reiter-Regiment 2 (Siberian Cossack volunteers)
 XV. Kosaken-Kavallerie-Korps (Kotelnikovo Cossack volunteers)
 Freiwilligen-Stamm-Regiment 5 (Cossack volunteers)

Caucasian mixed volunteer units
 Freiwilligen-Stamm-Division (Georgian, Turkish, North Caucasian, Armenian & Azerbaijani volunteers)

Caucasian, Central Asian, Crimean and Ural mixed volunteer units

 Waffen-Gruppe Turkistan
 Waffen-Gruppe Idel-Ural
 Waffen-Gruppe Azerbaijan
 Waffen-Gruppe Krim

Propaganda newspapers for Caucasian and Cossack units
Azerbaijan
 Azerbajçan – Azerbaijani Legion

Kalmykia
 Kalmyckij Boec ("Kalmyk Soldier") – Kalmyk Cavalry Corps

Kosaken (Cossack Nation)
 Kosaken-Illustrierte ("Cossack Illustrated") – 1st Cossack Cavalry Division (trilingual)
 La terra dei cosacchi ("The Land of the Cossacks") – Cossack units in upper Italy

Krimtürken (Crimean Tatars)
 Kirim ("Crimea") – Weekly paper for the Crimean Tatar volunteers, Berlin 1944–1945

Tataren (Tatar nation)
 Deutsch-tatarisches Nachrichtenblatt ("German-Tatar News Journal") – Volga Tatar Legion, monthly publication, Berlin 1944–1945 (bilingual)

Turkestaner (Central Asian nation)
 Yeni Türkistan ("New Turkestan") – Turkistan Legion
 Svoboda ("Freedom") – 162nd Turkoman Division
 Türk Birligi ("Turkish Unity") – Osttürkischer Waffen-Verband der SS, weekly publication, Berlin 1944–1945

German commanders of Central Asian, Caucasian and Cossack units

These German commanders also received honorary military or leading titles between their units at charge; for example Helmuth von Pannwitz received the title of "Ataman" from his Cossack units.

 Generalleutnant Helmuth von Pannwitz
 Oberst Hans-Joachim von Schultz
 Oberstleutnant Günther von Steinsdorff
 Oberst von Baath
 Oberst Freiherr von Nolcken
 Oberst Konstantin Wagner
 Sonderführer Othmar Rudolf Wyrba a.k.a. "Dr. Doll" (German, Tibetan and Mongolian language expert; leader of the Kalmuck units)
 Oberstleutnant Pipgorra
 Oberst Raimund Hoerst
 SS-Obersturmbannführer Andreas Meyer-Mader
 SS-Hauptsturmführer Billig
 SS-Hauptsturmführer Hermann
 SS-Sturmbannführer der Reserve Franz Liebermann
 SS-Hauptsturmführer Reiner Olzscha
 SS-Hauptsturmführer Fürst
 SS-Standartenführer Harun-el-Raschid Bey (of the central Asian legions; was a German who converted to Islam while serving as an advisor to Enver Pasha)
 Generalmajor Prof. Dr. Oskar Ritter von Niedermayer
 Generalleutnant Ralph von Heygendorff

German representative of the Ministry for the Occupied Eastern Territories
 Otto Bräutigam

Central Asian, Caucasian and Cossack political leaders
 Cossack Ataman General Pyotr Krasnov
 Cossack Ataman General Andrei Shkuro
 Cossack Ataman Vasili Glazkov
 Kalmuk Prince Tundotov

Puppet Governments and Organizations in the USSR
 Provisional Government of Lithuania
 Zuyev Republic
 Belarusian Central Council
 Lokot Autonomy (later Lepel Republic)
 Ukrainian National Government
 Ukrainian National Committee
 Provisional Popular Revolutionary Government of Chechnya-Ingushetia
 Liberation Movement of the Peoples of Russia
 Committee for the Liberation of the Peoples of Russia
 North Caucasus National Committee
 Turkestan National Committee
 Patriotic Union Tetri Giorgi
 Cossack Central Office
 National Karachai Committee
 Armenian National Committee
 Kalmyk National Committee
 Simferopol Muslim Committee
 Tatar Committee
 Eastern Turkish Council
 Caucasian Council
 Cossack National Liberation Movement
 Main Board of the Cossack Forces
 Russian Committee in Latvia
 Belarusian Committee (Warsaw)
 Belarusian Committee (Białystok)
 Belarusian Representation
 Belarusian Self-Help Committee
 Belarusian National Center
 Belarusian Cultural Assembly
 Committee to Combat Bolshevism
 Russian Committee
 Caucasian Committee in the General Government
 Commission for Cossacks
 Gathering of the nations enslaved by Russia

Other

See also
 Collaboration with the Axis Powers during World War II
 Georgian uprising on Texel
 Waffen-SS foreign volunteers and conscripts
 Non-Germans in the German armed forces during World War II
 361st Infantry Regiment (Wehrmacht) - recruited among Germans from the French Foreign Legion
 Selbstschutz

References

Bibliography
 
 Elizabeth M.F. Grasmeder, "Leaning on Legionnaires: Why Modern States Recruit Foreign Soldiers," International Security (July 2021), Vol 46 (No. 1), pp. 147–195.

Further reading
 Elizabeth M.F. Grasmeder, "Leaning on Legionnaires: Why Modern States Recruit Foreign Soldiers," International Security (July 2021), Vol 46 (No. 1), pp. 147–195.

 
Crimea in World War II
History of the Caucasus under the Soviet Union
History of the Cossacks
History of the Turkic peoples